Saturday Night Live Weekend Update Thursday is an American limited-run series broadcast on NBC. It is a political satire news show spin-off from Saturday Night Live, featuring that show's Weekend Update segment. It initially ran for three 30-minute episodes in October 2008, during the lead-up to the 2008 United States presidential election.

On March 14, 2017, NBC ordered a three-episode fourth iteration to be hosted by Michael Che and Colin Jost, premiering August 10, 2017, and going by the title Weekend Update Summer Edition.

Production history

Fall 2008
It premiered on Thursday, October 9, 2008, at 9:30 p.m. ET, after The Office. The remaining episodes aired in the same timeslot on October 16 and 23.

The format consists of a topical cold open sketch similar to most episodes of SNL, followed by an extended Weekend Update for the remaining time. The series is essentially a continuation of the short-form "primetime extra" specials which have aired intermittently since the 2000–2001 season, when NBC needed to fill time following "supersized" 40-minute episodes of Friends.

Several former Saturday Night Live alumni returned to this show: Will Ferrell reprised his role as President George W. Bush, while Tina Fey appeared as vice presidential candidate Sarah Palin, in a continuation of her much-publicized appearances on the regular show. During the first show, Bill Murray appeared as himself, one of the undecided voters at the second presidential debate sketch. Chris Parnell appeared in the first two episodes as the moderators of the debates, Tom Brokaw and Bob Schieffer.

Fall 2009
Although originally intended to be a limited-run series, NBC announced on May 4, 2009, that they had ordered six new episodes of the show, making it the only show NBC introduced at the beginning of the 2008–2009 fall season to survive into a second term.

Darrell Hammond made guest appearances in the first three episodes, despite no longer being an SNL cast member. Former cast member Amy Poehler also returned as a special guest to co-anchor the first two episodes of the season. Although six were announced, the spring 2010 episodes were scrapped.

Fall 2012
NBC announced two SNL specials to be broadcast on 8 p.m. Thursday beginning September 20, 2012. This time around, the show was listed as "SNL Primetime Election Special" in some TV listings, but the actual on-air program retained its original title.

Summer 2017
On March 14, 2017, NBC announced a three-episode run of the series beginning August 10, 2017. This time, the program takes on the title of Saturday Night Live Weekend Update: Summer Edition and, with the exception of the third episode, completely does away with the cold open sketch and goes right into the news.

Episodes

Season 1 (2008)

Season 2 (2009)
Despite Lorne Michaels saying that three episodes would be airing in Fall 2009, then another three in early 2010, and three in Spring 2010, there were only three Weekend Update Thursday installments that occurred in Fall 2009.

Season 3 (2012)

Season 4 (2017)

References

External links
 

Weekend Update Thursday
NBC original programming
2000s American late-night television series
2010s American late-night television series
2000s American political comedy television series
2010s American political comedy television series
2000s American satirical television series
2010s American satirical television series
2000s American sketch comedy television series
2010s American sketch comedy television series
2000s American television news shows
2010s American television news shows
2000s American variety television series
2010s American variety television series
2008 American television series debuts
American news parodies
American television spin-offs
English-language television shows
Political satirical television series
Television shows directed by Don Roy King
Weekend Update Thursday
Weekend Update Thursday